"Say Hello to Goodbye" is the third single taken from Barbadian singer Shontelle's second album No Gravity (2010). It was sent to mainstream radio in the United States on March 15, 2011. The music video premiered on VEVO on May 20, 2011. The song was written by Martin Hansen, Shontelle Layne and Hanne Sorvaag.

Music video
A music video to accompany the release of "Say Hello to Goodbye" was first released onto YouTube on May 20, 2011 at a total length of three minutes and fifty-five seconds.

Track listing

Credits and personnel
Lead vocals – Shontelle
Producers – Martin Hansen
Lyrics – Martin Hansen, Shontelle Layne, Hanne Sorvaag
Label: SRC Records

Chart performance

References

2011 singles
Shontelle songs
2010 songs
Songs written by Hanne Sørvaag
Songs written by Shontelle
SRC Records singles